In phenomenology, the terms the Other and the Constitutive Other identify the other human being, in their differences from the Self, as being a cumulative, constituting factor in the self-image of a person; as acknowledgement of being real; hence, the Other is dissimilar to and the opposite of the Self, of Us, and of the Same. The Constitutive Other is the relation between the personality (essential nature) and the person (body) of a human being; the relation of essential and superficial characteristics of personal identity that corresponds to the relationship between opposite, but correlative, characteristics of the Self, because the difference is inner-difference, within the Self.

The condition and quality of Otherness (the characteristics of the Other) is the state of being different from and alien to the social identity of a person and to the identity of the Self. In the discourse of philosophy, the term Otherness identifies and refers to the characteristics of Who? and What? of the Other, which are distinct and separate from the Symbolic order of things; from the Real (the authentic and unchangeable); from the æsthetic (art, beauty, taste); from political philosophy; from social norms and social identity; and from the Self. Therefore, the condition of Otherness is a person's non-conformity to and with the social norms of society; and Otherness is the condition of disenfranchisement (political exclusion), effected either by the State or by the social institutions (e.g., the professions) invested with the corresponding socio-political power. Therefore, the imposition of Otherness alienates the person labelled as "the Other" from the centre of society, and places him or her at the margins of society, for being the Other.

The term Othering describes the reductive action of labelling and defining a person as a subaltern native, as someone who belongs to the socially subordinate category of the Other. The practice of Othering excludes persons who do not fit the norm of the social group, which is a version of the Self; likewise, in human geography, the practice of othering persons means to exclude and displace them from the social group to the margins of society, where mainstream social norms do not apply to them, for being the Other.

Background

Philosophy

John Stuart Mill introduced the idea of the other mind in 1865 in An Examination of Sir William Hamilton's Philosophy, the first formulation of the other after René Descartes. 

The concept of the Self requires the existence of the constitutive Other as the counterpart entity required for defining the Self; in the late 18th century, Georg Wilhelm Friedrich Hegel (1770–1831) introduced the concept of the Other as a constituent part of self-consciousness (preoccupation with the Self), which complements the propositions about self-awareness (capacity for introspection) proffered by Johann Gottlieb Fichte (1762–1814).

Edmund Husserl (1859–1938) applied the concept of the Other as the basis for intersubjectivity, the psychological relations among people. In Cartesian Meditations: An Introduction to Phenomenology (1931), Husserl said that the Other is constituted as an alter ego, as an other self. As such, the Other person posed and was an epistemological problem—of being only a perception of the consciousness of the Self.

In Being and Nothingness: An Essay on Phenomenological Ontology (1943), Jean-Paul Sartre (1905–1980) applied the dialectic of intersubjectivity to describe how the world is altered by the appearance of the Other, of how the world then appears to be oriented to the Other person, and not to the Self. The Other appears as a psychological phenomenon in the course of a person's life, and not as a radical threat to the existence of the Self. In that mode, in The Second Sex (1949), Simone de Beauvoir (1908–1986) applied the concept of Otherness to Hegel's dialectic of the "Lord and Bondsman" (Herrschaft und Knechtschaft, 1807) and found it to be like the dialectic of the Man–Woman relationship, thus a true explanation for society's treatment and mistreatment of women.

Psychology
The psychoanalyst Jacques Lacan (1901–1981) and the philosopher of ethics Emmanuel Levinas (1906–1995) established the contemporary definitions, usages, and applications of the constitutive Other, as the radical counterpart of the Self. Lacan associated the Other with language and with the symbolic order of things. Levinas associated the Other with the ethical metaphysics of scripture and tradition; the ethical proposition is that the Other is superior and prior to the Self.

In the event, Levinas re-formulated the face-to-face encounter (wherein a person is morally responsible to the Other person) to include the propositions of Jacques Derrida (1930–2004) about the impossibility of the Other (person) being an entirely metaphysical pure-presence. That the Other could be an entity of pure Otherness (of alterity) personified in a representation created and depicted with language that identifies, describes, and classifies. The conceptual re-formulation of the nature of the Other also included Levinas's analysis of the distinction between "the saying and the said"; nonetheless, the nature of the Other retained the priority of ethics over metaphysics.

In the psychology of the mind (e.g. R. D. Laing), the Other identifies and refers to the unconscious mind, to silence, to insanity, and to language ("to what is referred and to what is unsaid"). Nonetheless, in such psychologic and analytic usages, there might arise a tendency to relativism if the Other person (as a being of pure, abstract alterity) leads to ignoring the commonality of truth. Likewise, problems arise from unethical usages of the terms The Other, Otherness, and Othering to reinforce ontological divisions of reality: of being, of becoming, and of existence.

Ethics

In Totality and Infinity: An Essay on Exteriority (1961), Emmanuel Lévinas said that previous philosophy had reduced the constitutive Other to an object of consciousness, by not preserving its absolute alterity — the innate condition of otherness, by which the Other radically transcends the Self and the totality of the human network, into which the Other is being placed. As a challenge to self-assurance, the existence of the Other is a matter of ethics, because the ethical priority of the Other equals the primacy of ethics over ontology in real life.

From that perspective, Lévinas described the nature of the Other as "insomnia and wakefulness"; an ecstasy (an exteriority) towards the Other that forever remains beyond any attempt at fully capturing the Other, whose Otherness is infinite; even in the murder of an Other, the Otherness of the person remains uncontrolled and not negated. The infinity of the Other allowed Lévinas to derive other aspects of philosophy and science as secondary to that ethic; thus:

Critical theory
Jacques Derrida said that the absolute alterity of the Other is compromised, because the Other person is other than the Self and the group. The logic of alterity (otherness) is especially negative in the realm of human geography, wherein the native Other is denied ethical priority as a person with the right to participate in the geopolitical discourse with an empire who decides the colonial fate of the homeland of the Other. In that vein, the language of Otherness used in Oriental Studies perpetuates the cultural perspective of the dominantor–dominated relation, which is characteristic of hegemony; likewise, the sociologic misrepresentation of the feminine as the sexual Other to man reasserts male privilege as the primary voice in social discourse between women and men.

In The Colonial Present: Afghanistan, Palestine and Iraq (2004), the geographer Derek Gregory said that the US government's ideologic answers to questions about reasons for the terrorist attacks against the U.S. (i.e. 11 September 2001) reinforced the imperial purpose of the negative representations of the Middle-Eastern Other; especially when President G. W. Bush (2001–2009) rhetorically asked: "Why do they hate us?" as political prelude to the War on Terror (2001). Bush's rhetorical interrogation of armed resistance to empire, by the non–Western Other, produced an Us-and-Them mentality in American relations with the non-white peoples of the Middle East; hence, as foreign policy, the War on Terror is fought for control of imaginary geographies, which originated from the fetishised cultural representations of the Other invented by Orientalists; the cultural critic Edward Saïd said that:

Imperialism and colonialism
The contemporary, post-colonial world system of nation-states (with interdependent politics and economies) was preceded by the European imperial system of economic and settler colonies in which "the creation and maintenance of an unequal economic, cultural, and territorial relationship, usually between states, and often in the form of an empire, [was] based on domination and subordination." In the imperialist world system, political and economic affairs were fragmented, and the discrete empires "provided for most of their own needs ... [and disseminated] their influence solely through conquest [empire] or the threat of conquest [hegemony]."

Racism 

The racialist perspective of the Western world during the 18th and 19th centuries was invented with the Othering of non-white peoples, which also was supported with the fabrications of scientific racism, such as the pseudo-science of phrenology, which claimed that, in relation to a white-man's head, the head-size of the non-European Other indicated inferior intelligence; e.g. the apartheid-era cultural representations of coloured people in South Africa (1948–94).

Consequent to the Holocaust (1941–1945), with documents such as The Race Question (1950) and the Declaration on the Elimination of All Forms of Racial Discrimination (1963), the United Nations officially declared that racial differences are insignificant to anthropological likeness among human beings. Despite the United Nations' factual dismissal of racialism, institutional Othering in the United States produces the cultural misrepresentation of political refugees as illegal immigrants (from overseas) and of immigrants as illegal aliens (usually from México).

Orientalism
To European peoples, imperialism (military conquest of non-white peoples, annexation, and economic integration of their countries to the motherland) was intellectually justified by (among other reasons) orientalism, the study and fetishization of the Eastern world as "primitive peoples" requiring modernisation the civilising mission. Colonial empires were justified and realised with essentialist and reductive representations (of people, places and cultures) in books and pictures and fashion, which conflated different cultures and peoples into the binary relation of The Orient and The Occident. Orientalism created the artificial existence of the Western Self and the non–western Other. Orientalists rationalised the cultural artifice of a difference of essence between white and non-white peoples to fetishize (identify, classify, subordinate) the peoples and cultures of Asia into "the Oriental Other" — who exists in opposition to the Western Self. As a function of imperial ideology, Orientalism fetishizes people and things in three actions of cultural imperialism: (i) Homogenization (all Oriental peoples are one folk); (ii) Feminization (the Oriental always is subordinate in the East–West relation); and (iii) Essentialization (a people possess universal characteristics); thus established by Othering, the empire's cultural hegemony reduces to inferiority the people, places, and things of the Eastern world, as measured against the West, the standard of superior civilisation.

The subaltern native

Colonial stability requires the cultural subordination of the non-white Other for transformation into the subaltern native; a colonised people who facilitate the exploitation of their labour, of their lands, and of the natural resources of their country. The practise of Othering justifies the physical domination and cultural subordination of the native people by degrading them — first from being a national-citizen to being a colonial-subject — and then by displacing them to the periphery of the colony, and of geopolitical enterprise that is imperialism.

Using the false dichotomy of "colonial strength" (imperial power) against "native weakness" (military, social, and economic), the coloniser invents the non-white Other in an artificial dominator-dominated relationship that can be resolved only through racialist noblesse oblige, the "moral responsibility" that psychologically allows the colonialist Self to believe that imperialism is a civilising mission to educate, convert, and then culturally assimilate the Other into the empire — thus transforming the "civilised" Other into the Self.

In establishing a colony, Othering a non-white people allowed the colonisers to physically subdue and "civilise" the natives to establish the hierarchies of domination (political and social) required for exploiting the subordinated natives and their country. As a function of empire, a settler colony is an economic means for profitably disposing of two demographic groups: (i) the colonists (surplus population of the motherland) and (ii) the colonised (the subaltern native to be exploited) who antagonistically define and represent the Other as separate and apart from the colonial Self.

Othering establishes unequal relationships of power between the colonised natives and the colonisers, who believe themselves essentially superior to the natives whom they othered into racial inferiority, as the non-white Other. That dehumanisation maintains the false binary-relations of social class, caste, and race, of sex and gender, and of nation and religion. The profitable functioning of a colony (economic or settler) requires continual protection of the cultural demarcations that are basic to the unequal socio-economic relation between the "civilised man" (the colonist) and the "savage man", thus the transformation of the Other into the colonial subaltern.

Gender and sex

LGBT identities 
The social exclusion function of Othering a person or a social group from mainstream society to the social marginsfor being essentially different from the societal norm (the plural Self)is a socio-economic function of gender. In a society wherein man–woman heterosexuality is the sexual norm, the Other refers to and identifies lesbians (women who love women) and gays (men who love men) as people of same-sex orientation whom society has othered as "sexually deviant" from the norms of binary-gender heterosexuality. In practise, sexual Othering is realised by applying the negative denotations and connotations of the terms that describe lesbian, gay, bisexual and transgender people, in order to diminish their personal social status and political power, and so displace their LGBT communities to the legal margin of society. To neutralise such cultural Othering, LGBT communities queer a city by creating social spaces that use the spatial and temporal plans of the city to allow the LGBT communities free expression of their social identities, e.g. a boystown, a gay-pride parade, etc.; as such, queering urban spaces is a political means for the non-binary sexual Other to establish themselves as citizens integral to the reality (cultural and socio-economic) of their city's body politic.

Woman as identity 

The philosopher of feminism, Cheshire Calhoun identified the female Other as the female-half of the binary-gender relation that is the Man and Woman relation. The deconstruction of the word Woman (the subordinate party in the Man and Woman relation) produced a conceptual reconstruction of the female Other as the Woman who exists independently of male definition, as rationalised by patriarchy. That the female Other is a self-aware Woman who is autonomous and independent of the patriarchy's formal subordination of the female sex with the institutional limitations of social convention, tradition, and customary law; the social subordination of women is communicated (denoted and connoted) in the sexist usages of the word Woman.

In 1949, the philosopher of existentialism, Simone de Beauvoir applied Hegel's conception of "the Other" (as a constituent part of Self-awareness) to describe a male-dominated culture that represents Woman as the sexual Other to Man. In a patriarchal culture, the Man–Woman relation is society's normative binary-gender relation, wherein the sexual Other is a social minority with the least socio-political agency, usually the women of the community, because patriarchal semantics established that "a man represents both the positive and the neutral, as indicated by the common use of [the word] Man to designate human beings in general; whereas [the word] Woman represents only the negative, defined by limiting criteria, without reciprocity" from the first sex, from Man.

In 1957, Betty Friedan reported that a woman's social identity is formally established by the sexual politics of the Ordinate–Subordinate nature of the Man–Woman sexual relation, the social norm in the patriarchal West. When queried about their post-graduate lives, the majority of women interviewed at a university-class reunion, used binary gender language, and referred to and identified themselves by their social roles (wife, mother, lover) in the private sphere of life; and did not identify themselves by their own achievements (job, career, business) in the public sphere of life. Unawares, the women had acted conventionally, and automatically identified and referred to themselves as the social Other to men.

Although the nature of the social Other is influenced by the society's social constructs (social class, sex, gender), as a human organisation, society holds the socio-political power to formally change the social relation between the male-defined Self and Woman, the sexual Other, who is not male.

In feminist definition, women are the Other to men (but not the Other proposed by Hegel) and are not existentially defined by masculine demands; and also are the social Other who unknowingly accepts social subjugation as part of subjectivity, because the gender identity of woman is constitutionally different from the gender identity of man. The harm of Othering is in the asymmetric nature of unequal roles in sexual and gender relations; the inequality arises from the social mechanics of intersubjectivity.

Knowledge

Cultural representations
About the production of knowledge of the Other who is not the Self, the philosopher Michel Foucault said that Othering is the creation and maintenance of imaginary “knowledge of the Other” — which comprises cultural representations in service to socio-political power and the establishment of hierarchies of domination. That cultural representations of the Other (as a metaphor, as a metonym, and as an anthropomorphism) are manifestations of the xenophobia inherent to the European historiographies that defined and labelled non–European peoples as the Other who is not the European Self. Supported by the reductive discourses (academic and commercial, geopolitical and military) of the empire's dominant ideology, the colonialist misrepresentations of the Other explain the Eastern world to the Western world as a binary relation of native weakness against colonial strength.

In the 19th-century historiographies of the Orient as a cultural region, the Orientalists studied only what they said was the high culture (languages and literatures, arts and philologies) of the Middle East, but did not study that geographic space as a place inhabited by different nations and societies. About that Western version of the Orient, Edward Saïd said that:

 

In so far as The Orient occurred in the existential awareness of the Western world, as a term, The Orient later accrued many meanings and associations, denotations and connotations that did not refer to the real peoples, cultures, and geography of the Eastern world, but to Oriental Studies, the academic field about The Orient as a word.

The Academy

In the Eastern world, the field of Occidentalism, the investigation programme and academic curriculum of and about the essence of The West — Europe as a culturally homogeneous place — did not exist as a counterpart to Orientalism. In the postmodern era, the Orientalist practices of historical negationism, the writing of distorted histories about the places and peoples of "The East", continues in contemporary journalism; e.g. in the Third World, political parties practice Othering with fabricated facts about threat-reports and non-existent threats (political, social, military) that are meant to politically delegitimise opponent political parties composed of people from the social and ethnic groups designated as the Other in that society.

The Othering of a person or of a social group — by means of an ideal ethnocentricity (the ethnic group of the Self) that evaluates and assigns negative, cultural meaning to the ethnic Other — is realised through cartography; hence, the maps of Western cartographers emphasised and bolstered artificial representations of the national-identities, the natural resources, and the cultures of the native inhabitants, as culturally inferior to the West.

Historically, Western cartography often featured distortions (proportionate, proximate, and commercial) of places and true distances by placing the cartographer's homeland in the centre of the mapamundi; these ideas were often utilized to support imperialistic expansion. In contemporary cartography, the polar-perspective maps of the northern hemisphere, drawn by U.S. cartographers, also frequently feature distorted spatial relations (distance, size, mass) of and between the U.S. and Russia which according to historian Jerome D. Fellman emphasise the perceived inferiority (military, cultural, geopolitical) of the Russian Other.

Practical perspectives

In Key Concepts in Political Geography (2009), Alison Mountz proposed concrete definitions of the Other as a philosophic concept and as a term within phenomenology; as a noun, the Other identifies and refers to a person and to a group of persons; as a verb, the Other identifies and refers to a category and a label for persons and things.

Post-colonial scholarship demonstrated that, in pursuit of empire, "the colonizing powers narrated an 'Other' whom they set out to save, dominate, control, [and] civilize . . . [in order to] extract resources through colonization" of the country whose people the colonial power designated as the Other. As facilitated by Orientalist representations of the non–Western Other, colonization — the economic exploitation of a people and their land – is misrepresented as a civilizing mission launched for the material, cultural, and spiritual benefit of the colonized peoples.

Counter to the post-colonial perspective of the Other as part of a Dominator–Dominated binary relationship, postmodern philosophy presents the Other and Otherness as phenomenological and ontological progress for Man and Society. Public knowledge of the social identity of peoples classified as "Outsiders" is de facto acknowledgement of their being real, thus they are part of the body politic, especially in the cities. As such, "the post-modern city is a geographical celebration of difference that moves sites once conceived of as 'marginal' to the [social] centre of discussion and analysis" of the human relations between the Outsiders and the Establishment.

See also

References

Sources
 Thomas, Calvin, ed. (2000). "Introduction: Identification, Appropriation, Proliferation", Straight with a Twist: Queer Theory and the Subject of Heterosexuality. University of Illinois Press. .
 Cahoone, Lawrence (1996). From Modernism to Postmodernism: An Anthology. Cambridge, Mass.: Blackwell.
 Colwill, Elizabeth. (2005). Reader—Wmnst 590: Feminist Thought. KB Books.
 Haslanger, Sally. Feminism and Metaphysics: Unmasking Hidden Ontologies. 28 November 2005.
 McCann, Carole. Kim, Seung-Kyung. (2003). Feminist Theory Reader: Local and Global Perspectives. Routledge. New York, NY.
 Rimbaud, Arthur (1966). "Letter to Georges Izambard", Complete Works and Selected Letters. Trans. Wallace Fowlie. Chicago: University of Chicago Press.
 Nietzsche, Friedrich (1974). The Gay Science. Trans. Walter Kaufmann. New York: Vintage.
 Saussure, Ferdinand de (1986). Course in General Linguistics. Eds. Charles Bally and Albert Sechehaye. Trans. Roy Harris. La Salle, Ill.: Open Court.
 Lacan, Jacques (1977). Écrits: A Selection. Trans. Alan Sheridan. New York: Norton.
 Althusser, Louis (1973). Lenin and Philosophy and Other Essays. Trans. Ben Brewster. New York: Monthly Review Press.
 Warner, Michael (1990). "Homo-Narcissism; or, Heterosexuality", Engendering Men, p. 191. Eds. Boone and Cadden, London UK: Routledge.
 Tuttle, Howard (1996). The Crowd is Untruth, Peter Lang Publishing, .

Further reading
 Levinas, Emmanuel (1974). Autrement qu'être ou au-delà de l'essence. (Otherwise than Being or Beyond Essence).
 Levinas, Emmanuel (1972). Humanism de l'autre homme. Fata Morgana.
 Lacan, Jacques (1966). Ecrits. London: Tavistock, 1977.
 Lacan, Jacques (1964). The Four Fondamental Concepts of Psycho-analysis. London: Hogarth Press, 1977.
 Foucault, Michel (1990). The History of Sexuality vol. 1: An Introduction. Trans. Robert Hurley. New York: Vintage.
 Derrida, Jacques (1973). Speech and Phenomena and Other Essays on Husserl's Theory of Signs. Trans. David B. Allison. Evanston: Ill.: Northwestern University Press.
 Kristeva, Julia (1982). Powers of Horror: An Essay on Abjection. Trans. Leon S. Roudiez. New York: Columbia University Press.
 Butler, Judith (1990). Gender Trouble: Feminism and the Subversion of Identity. New York: Routledge.
 Butler, Judith (1993). Bodies That Matter: On the Discursive Limits of "Sex". New York: Routledge.
 Zuckermann, Ghil'ad (2006), "'Etymythological Othering' and the Power of 'Lexical Engineering' in Judaism, Islam and Christianity. A Socio-Philo(sopho)logical Perspective", Explorations in the Sociology of Language and Religion, edited by Tope Omoniyi and Joshua A. Fishman, Amsterdam: John Benjamins, pp. 237–258.

External links

The Centre for Studies in Otherness

Concepts in metaphysics
Phenomenology
Conceptions of self
Identity (philosophy)